Ligeriella is a genus of flies in the family Tachinidae.

Species
Ligeriella aristata (Villeneuve, 1911)
Ligeriella coxalis Shima, 1994

References

Exoristinae
Tachinidae genera
Diptera of Asia